UVC may refer to:

Science and technology
 Ultraviolet C, a subtype of ultraviolet light
 Universal Virtual Computer, a concept in digital archiving
 Umbilical venous catheter or umbilical vein catheter, a type of umbilical line in neonatal medicine
 USB video device class, for connecting video cameras
 Far Ultraviolet Camera/Spectrograph, one of the experiments deployed on the lunar surface by the Apollo 16 astronauts

Other uses
 United Volleyball Club, a volleyball club in the Philippines.
 Uniform Vehicle Code, a set of US traffic laws
 Unidad de Valor Constante, a former currency created by the "Ley de Valores" of Ecuador in 1993